sampling theory may mean:

 Nyquist–Shannon sampling theorem, digital signal processing (DSP)
 Statistical sampling
 Fourier sampling